

League notes
The League admits the Winnipeg Rangers.  This team is not to be confused with the Winnipeg Barons, who were formerly called the Winnipeg Rangers.
Ray Brunel (St. Boniface) set a league record for most points (105) in a single season.

Regular season

Playoffs
Semi-Final
Monarchs defeated Rangers 3-games-to-1
Turnbull Cup Championship
St. Boniface lost to Monarchs 4-games-to-2 with 1 game tied
Western Memorial Cup Semi-Final
Monarchs  lost to Fort William Canadiens (TBJHL) 4-games-to-3 with 1 game tied

Awards

All-Star Teams

References
Manitoba Junior Hockey League
Manitoba Hockey Hall of Fame
Hockey Hall of Fame
Winnipeg Free Press Archives
Brandon Sun Archives

MJHL
Manitoba Junior Hockey League seasons